Bakke Church is a parish church of the Church of Norway in the large Flekkefjord Municipality in Agder county, Norway. It is located in the village of Sira. It is the church for the Bakke parish which is part of the Lister og Mandal prosti (deanery) in the Diocese of Agder og Telemark. The white, wooden church was built in a cruciform design in 1670 using plans drawn up by an unknown architect. The church seats about 400 people.

History

Early records show that there was a stave church located at Bakke during the middle ages, but not much is known of that church. In 1668, the choir of the old church was torn down and replaced with a new timber-framed structure. Shortly afterwards, the nave of the old church was torn down and replaced with a new timber-framed structure. After these two renovations, the entire building was essentially brand new. In 1757, the church was significantly renovated and enlarged. In 1806–1807, the church was again renovated by removing the roof, raising the heights of the walls and rebuilding the roof.

In 1814, this church served as an election church. Together with more than 300 other parish churches across Norway, it was a polling station for elections to the 1814 Norwegian Constituent Assembly which wrote the Constitution of Norway. This was Norway's first national elections. Each church parish was a constituency that elected people called "electors" who later met together in each county to elect the representatives for the assembly that was to meet in Eidsvoll later that year.

See also
List of churches in Agder og Telemark

References

Flekkefjord
Churches in Agder
Wooden churches in Norway
Cruciform churches in Norway
17th-century Church of Norway church buildings
Churches completed in 1670
Norwegian election church